Ælfgar may refer to:

Ælfgar of Lichfield (died c. 947), bishop of Lichfield
Ælfgar of Elmham (died 1021), bishop of Elmham
Ælfgar, Earl of Mercia (1030–1062), earl of Mercia
Ælfgar of Selwood, saint venerated in later medieval Somerset

Old English given names
Masculine given names